The China–Korea Tengen was a Go competition. It was played between China's Tianyuan titleholder and Korea's Chunwon titleholder each year in a best-of-three match. The competition was held 19 times, from 1997 to 2015. China won 10 times and Korea won 9 times. The Chunwon was discontinued after 2015, which ended the China–Korea Tengen as well.

Past winners and runners-up

See also
China–Japan Tengen
List of professional Go tournaments

References

External links
China Korea Tengen at Sensei's Library

International Go competitions
Go competitions in South Korea
Go competitions in China